Sanjay Dhull (born 8 October 1996) is an Indian cricketer. He made his List A debut for Haryana in the 2017–18 Vijay Hazare Trophy on 16 February 2018.

References

External links
 

1996 births
Living people
Indian cricketers
Place of birth missing (living people)
Haryana cricketers